Greatest Remix Hits is a series of remix albums by Australian recording artist Kylie Minogue. Vol. 3 peaked at number 67 on the ARIA albums chart while Vol. 4 peaked at number 66.

Background and release
The series was distributed by Warner Music Australia.

Volumes 1 and 2 were originally released exclusively in Japan during 1993. In 1998, these volumes were re-released with revised cover art by Mushroom Records in Australia. With this re-issue, two new volumes were also released. The series contained rare and previously unavailable remixes by Minogue during her time with PWL.

One track included in this series, titled "I Am the One for You", was originally recorded during the "Rhythm of Love" sessions. It was unreleased before this series was issued.

Track listings

Greatest Remix Hits 1

Greatest Remix Hits 2

Greatest Remix Hits 3

Greatest Remix Hits 4

Charts

References

External links
Kylie.com — official website.

Kylie Minogue remix albums
1997 greatest hits albums
1997 remix albums
1998 greatest hits albums
1998 remix albums